Hanniel Jamin is Ghanaian singer, model, dancer and beauty pageant titleholder who was crowned Miss Universe Ghana in 2013, and represented Ghana at the Miss Universe 2013 pageant.

Early life
Jamin is a Model, Singer, and up-coming musical artiste. She graduated from one of the best Universities in Ghana.

Miss Universe Ghana 2013
Hanniel Jamin was crowned Miss Universe Ghana 2013 at the end of the pageant held at the La Palm Royal Hotel in Accra on Friday May 24, 2013.

Miss Universe 2013
Jamin represented Ghana at Miss Universe 2013 in Moscow, Russia on November 9, 2013, where she competed to succeed Olivia Culpo but failed to place in the semifinals.

Kidnapping
On Tuesday, September 3, 2013, Jamin was kidnapped in Accra for several hours. She was later released but her belongings were stolen.

References

External links
Official Miss Universe Ghana Facebook

Living people
Ghanaian beauty pageant winners
Miss Universe 2013 contestants
People from Accra
1994 births
Miss Universe Ghana winners